Conus cepasi is a species of predatory sea snail, a marine gastropod mollusk in the family Conidae, known as the cone snails, cone shells or cones.

Like all species within the genus Conus, these snails are predatory and venomous. They are capable of "stinging" humans, therefore live ones should be handled carefully or not at all.

Description
The size of the shell varies between 25 mm and 50 mm.

Distribution 
This marine species is endemic to Angola, Africa.

References 

 Rolán E. & Röckel D. 2000. The endemic Conus of Angola. Argonauta 13(2): 5-44, 150 figs.
 Filmer R.M. (2001). A Catalogue of Nomenclature and Taxonomy in the Living Conidae 1758 - 1998. Backhuys Publishers, Leiden. 388pp.
 Tucker J.K. (2009). Recent cone species database. September 4, 2009 Edition
 Puillandre N., Duda T.F., Meyer C., Olivera B.M. & Bouchet P. (2015). One, four or 100 genera? A new classification of the cone snails. Journal of Molluscan Studies. 81: 1-23

External links
 
 Cone Shells - Knights of the Sea

cepasi
Gastropods described in 1975
Invertebrates of Angola
Endemic fauna of Angola
Gastropods of Africa
Taxonomy articles created by Polbot